Goodenia eremophila  is a species of flowering plant in the family Goodeniaceae and is endemic to inland areas of Western Australia. It is an ascending herb with linear to elliptic leaves and thyrses of blue flowers.

Description

Taxonomy and naming
Goodenia eremophila was first formally described in 1905 by Ernst Georg Pritzel in Botanische Jahrbücher für Systematik, Pflanzengeschichte und Pflanzengeographie. The specific epithet (eremophila) means "solitary-loving".

Distribution and habitat
This goodenia grows in sandy soli between Wiluna and Kalgoorlie in the Great Victoria Desert, Little Sandy Desert, Murchison and Pilbara biogeographic regions of inland Western Australia.

Conservation status
Goodenia eremophila is classified as "not threatened" by the Government of Western Australia Department of Parks and Wildlife.

References

eremophila
Eudicots of Western Australia
Plants described in 1874
Taxa named by Ernst Pritzel
Endemic flora of Western Australia